Halliock Inn is a historic inn and tavern located at Village of the Branch in Suffolk County, New York.  It is composed of two main sections: the -story portion and a -story wing to form an "L" shaped building.  It dates to the 18th century.

It was added to the National Register of Historic Places in 1974. Today, the inn serves as medical offices.

References

External links

Hotel buildings on the National Register of Historic Places in New York (state)
Historic American Buildings Survey in New York (state)
Commercial buildings completed in 1825
Drinking establishments on the National Register of Historic Places in New York (state)
Buildings and structures in Suffolk County, New York
National Register of Historic Places in Smithtown (town), New York
Taverns on the National Register of Historic Places in New York (state)
1825 establishments in New York (state)